Rustum is a 1984 Telugu-language action film, produced by S. P. Venkanna Babu under the Maheswari Movies banner and directed by A. Kodandarami Reddy. It stars Chiranjeevi and Urvashi (in her Telugu film debut), with music composed by Chakravarthy. The film was recorded as a ''Hit' at the box office.

Plot
The movie starts with Ganga Rayudu, the village panchayat head, who judges a dispute between Musalaiah and a rowdy, Gangaiah, that Musalaiah left the village under some unknown circumstances and returned after fifteen years, he learns that his house and farm were illegally acquired by Gangaiah and he is unwilling to return the property to Musalaiah, hence they came to the Panchayat. Rayudu supports Gangaiah and does injustice to Musalaiah, having insufficient power to face Rayudu, he again leaves the village.

A newcomer Hari enters the village and fights with Gangaiah and owns his property and does well to the village people. Village people start calling him Rustum. Hari works for the village welfare. Rayudu sets a trap to kick Hari out of the village. As a part of his trap, Rayudu gives the village head post to Hari. Meanwhile, Hari and Padma daughter of Rayudu falls in love and Hari also gets closer to Brahmaiah Naidu and Parvathi, a couple that is affected by Rayudu's injustice. Once Hari is suspected as the cause of a village girl's Lakshmi pregnancy and her suicide, hence Hari was asked to leave the village. Then even Padma suspects Hari. In the trial to prove that he is not the cause of Lakshmi's suicide, he knows that Giri, the son of Rayudu is the main reason. Rayudu fixes up Rudraiah, the younger brother of Brahmaiah Naidu, who was just released from prison, to kill Hari.

Meanwhile, Giri goes to the city and tracks down Musalaiah to find out why Hari came to the village. Giri knows the whole loop that Hari, is none other than Brahmaiah Naidu's son. When he was a child, he saw Rayudu murder someone. Musalaiah, who is Brahmaiah Naidu's servant, protects Hari and takes him to the city. Searching for his son at the same time, Brahmaiah Naidu comes to the murder spot and as per Rayudu's wishes, fixes up Rudraiah as the murderer, even Brahmaiah Naidu also believes that Rudraiah is the murderer and hence has him arrested. Musalaiah, Rudraiah, and Hari plan to punish Rayudu and do good to the village. Per their plan, Rudraiah and Hari fight as if they really are opponents. But when Rayudu learns the truth from Giri, he kidnaps Hari's entire family. Knowing the truth, Padma helps Hari to expose Rayudu. After the climax fight, Hari enters as a Police Inspector and arrests Rayudu.

Cast

Chiranjeevi as Hari
Urvashi as Padma 
Rao Gopal Rao as Ganga Rayudu
Satyanarayana as Rudraiah
Allu Ramalingaiah as Lingam
Gummadi as Brahmaiah Naidu
Giribabu as Giribabu 
Nutan Prasad as Chalapathi
Rajendra Prasad as Paper Punna Rao
Saikumar
Suthi Veerabhadra Rao as Chakali
Suthi Velu as Panthulu
Mikkilineni as Musalayya
Bheemaraju as Ramudu
Fight Master Raju as Pakir
Hema Sunder as Master
Kakarala as Dappu Eerigadu
Mithai Chitti as Samba
Mallikarjuna Rao as Gopayya
Chidatala Appa Rao
Chitti Babu
Rallapalli
Jagga Rao as Gangaiah
Annapurna as Parvathi
Rajyalakshmi as Lakshmi
Shubha as Gowri
K. Vijaya
Silk Smitha as item number
Nirmalamma as Jaggamma
Master Harish as Young Hari

Soundtrack

Music composed by Chakravarthy. Lyrics written by Veturi.

Others
 VCDs and DVDs on – SHALIMAR Video Company, Hyderabad

External links 
 

1980s Telugu-language films
1984 films
Films scored by K. Chakravarthy
Films directed by A. Kodandarami Reddy
1984 action films
Indian action films